The Fontes Tamarici, in Spanish Fuentes Tamáricas (English: Tamaric Fountains) are  three springs located by the geographer and Roman historian Pliny the Elder in classical Cantabria. Since the 18th century they have been identified with the source of La Reana in Velilla del Río Carrión, Palencia, Spain. The first mention of the spring, by Pliny, dates from the time of the Roman conquest of Cantabria.  Pliny records that the springs were frequently dry, while other nearby springs continued to flow; he says that the springs being dry was considered to be a bad omen.

History 
The Tamarici, one of the tribes that made up the Cantabri, inhabited the area from the 3rd century BC. They worshiped waters and the sacred springs. The exact year of the construction of the Fontes Tamarici is unknown, but when the Roman Empire conquered Cantabria in 19 BC, they found these sources that drew wide attention. The outbreak irregular emptying its waters and unexpected, accompanied by the noise that precedes underground filling, had to be at that time matter of respect and adoration. Possibly they were used as baths, laundry and omen. It has been also suggested that the fountain could be dedicated to a god of the waters, where predictions were made based on their irregular filling and emptying cycle. In the thirteenth century it was built beside a hermitage devoted to John the Baptist, to Christianize the place and delete all relations with pagan rites.

The curse of Pliny 

Studies of the naturalist and geographer Pliny the Elder on the lands occupied by the Roman Empire are crucial for knowledge and location of Tamaric Fountains. In his Naturalis Historiae, XXXI, 3, is where he alludes its particularity:

Lartius Licinius was a great supporter of the work of Pliny, with his intense desire for knowledge of new discoveries, he visited the spring when it were in their dry phase, and died a week after in 70 AD.

References

External links 

VelilladelrioCarrion.es: Tamaric Fountains in Velilla del Río Carrión—

Ancient Roman buildings and structures in Spain
Fountains in Spain
Buildings and structures in the Province of Palencia
Prophecy
Tourist attractions in Castile and León